Francisco de Paula Ney (February 2, 1858 – November 13, 1897) was a Brazilian poet and journalist. A pre-eminent figure of the bohemian Rio de Janeiro of the Belle Époque, he was a friend of Coelho Neto, Aluísio Azevedo and Olavo Bilac. He was a poet famous for writing anonymous satires and jokes for the journals where he worked.

External links
A biography and some poems by Francisco de Paula Ney 

1858 births
1897 deaths
19th-century Brazilian poets
Brazilian journalists
People from Ceará
Portuguese-language writers
19th-century journalists
Male journalists
Brazilian male poets
19th-century Brazilian male writers
Belle Époque